SPK  may refer to:

SPK (band), Australia
SPK, Soviet cosmonaut maneuvering unit
 Simultaneous pancreas-kidney transplant, a type of pancreas transplantation
 Socialist Patients' Collective (German: Sozialistisches Patientenkollektiv)
 Stiftung Preußischer Kulturbesitz, the Prussian Cultural Heritage Foundation
 Strategic Plan Campine (Dutch: Strategisch Plan Kempen)
 Sutton Parkway railway station's station code